Mumzy Stranger is a British-Bangladeshi singer, songwriter, rapper, composer and record producer.

Mumzy Stranger made his debut after being signed by Rishi Rich,  with his track "One More Dance", which was released in 2009. Later that year, he was featured in two tracks on The Streets of Bollywood 3, a remix album by Rishi Rich, Hunterz and Kami K, mainly focusing on bringing Indian and urban music together. The following year, he is released his debut mixtape No Stranger To This and his debut album Journey Begins. He is also heard on the soundtrack of Toonpur Ka Super Hero, making his debut on a Bollywood film soundtrack. On 18 November 2010, he supported Sean Kingston at The O2 Arena. Although making his singing debut with the 2009 single "One More Dance", he wrote his first song "Jump Up", from his 2008 mixtape Mumzy Mixtape, in 2005. He made his Sylheti singing debut with the song "Mone Kori (Thinking About You)" on his 2008 mixtape, Mumzy Mixtape and his Bengali debut in Jaan Atki Bangla Refix. He has also sung in Arabic in the multi-lingual single "Come My Way". Mumzy was also the founder of the multi-genre and multilingual South Asian collective, Stranger Family with Sayfuz (Char Avell), Junai Kaden (Jay Kadn), Natasha Tah (Tasha Tah), Ramee (Rameet Kaur Sandhu) and Javier Miraj (Salique). After launching his record label Timeless London, he formed the group 'Timeless Camp' with Nish, Lyan and Rupika.

Albums

Studio albums

Journey Begins (2010)

Vertigo (2019)

Extended plays

One More Dance (2009)

Fly With Me (Bonus Version) (2010)

Love Comfort (Remixes) (2014)

Diamond Jewel (Remixes) (2016)

5 Reasons (2020)

Mixtapes

Mumzy MixTape (2008)
DesiDrop.com exclusive, collection of Mumzy's promo songs

No Stranger To This - Hosted by DJ Limelight (2010)

Now or Never (with JusZonin) (2015)

Soundtracks

Singles

Production credits

Other songs

Guest appearances

Albums

Singles

References 

Stranger, Mumzy
Stranger, Mumzy